This is a list of museums with major collections of Asian art.

Palace Museum*, Beijing, China
 1,800,000 objects
 National Museum of China*, Beijing, China
 1,050,000 objects
 National Palace Museum*, Taipei, Taiwan
 700,000 objects
 National Museum of Korea, Seoul, South Korea
 150,000 objects
 Victoria & Albert Museum, London, England, UK
 130,000 objects
 Shanghai Museum*, China
 120,000 objects
 National Museum, Tokyo, Japan
 120,000 objects
 Museum of Fine Arts, Boston, Massachusetts, USA
 ~100,000 objects
 The Metropolitan Museum of Art, New York City, New York, USA
 60,000 objects
 American Museum of Natural History, New York City, New York, USA
 60,000 objects
 British Museum, London, England, UK
 55,000+ objects
 Musée du quai Branly, Paris, France.
 58,000 objects
 Musée Guimet, Paris, France
 ~50,000 objects
 Field Museum, Chicago, Illinois, USA
 ~50,000 objects
 Freer Gallery of Art / Arthur M. Sackler Gallery, Washington, District of Columbia, USA
 >40,000 objects
 Honolulu Museum of Art, Honolulu, Hawaii, USA
 ~40,000 objects
Art Institute of Chicago, Illinois, USA
 35,000 objects
 Museum für Asiatische Kunst, Berlin, Germany
 20,000 objects
 Brooklyn Museum, Brooklyn, New York, USA
 ~20,000 objects
 Asian Art Museum, San Francisco, California, USA
 18,000 objects
 Arthur M. Sackler Museum, Cambridge, Massachusetts, USA
 16,000 objects
 Nelson-Atkins Museum of Art, Kansas City, Missouri, USA
 10,450 objects
 Lytton Chinese History Museum*, Lytton, British Columbia, Canada 
 About 200 objects; museum destroyed by Lytton wildfire of 2021
 Birmingham Museum of Art, Birmingham, Alabama, USA 
More than 4,000 objects 
 Crow Museum of Asian Art, Dallas, Texas, USA
 Over 4, 000 objects 
 Belz Museum of Asian and Judaic Art, Memphis, Tennessee, USA
 Over 1, 000 objects

* These museums specialise in only Chinese items; the collections are not comprehensive for all Asia.

Several famous and distinguished collections, including the National Gallery of Canada in Ottawa, Cleveland Museum of Art, National Gallery of Australia in Canberra, Chicago's Field Museum, Minneapolis Institute of Art, Royal Ontario Museum, Museum of Archaeology at the University of Pennsylvania, Sydney's Art Gallery of New South Wales, Montreal Museum of Fine Arts, Los Angeles County Museum, Vancouver Art Gallery, Adelaide's Art Gallery of South Australia, Peabody Essex Museum in Salem, Massachusetts, Minneapolis Institute of Art, Chapel Hill, North Carolina's Ackland Art Museum, the Seattle Asian Art Museum and the Georges Labit Museum do not provide adequate numerical information for their significant collections. This list, therefore, is only provisional.

Some collecting institutions combine their ethnographic, cultural, and artistic materials together in their total holdings. Such is the case of the British Museum, for example. It would be nearly impossible to distinguish between these types of objects (e.g. "fine arts") in developing a quantitative, as opposed to qualitative, ranking of this kind.

References

See also 
List of collections of Japanese art
List of museums

Asian Art